The 1900 New Hampshire football team was an American football team that represented New Hampshire College of Agriculture and the Mechanic Arts during the 1900 college football season—the school became the University of New Hampshire in 1923. The team finished with a record of 1–6–1 or 1–5–1, per 1900 sources or modern sources, respectively.

Schedule
Scoring during this era awarded five points for a touchdown, one point for a conversion kick (extra point), and five points for a field goal. Teams played in the one-platoon system and the forward pass was not yet legal. Games were played in two halves rather than four quarters.

The November 21 loss to the Unity Athletic Club was reported in The Portsmouth Herald, but is absent from other sources.

Contemporary sources are clear that the Andover game was played in Massachusetts; modern sources list the site as Durham. Team captain Lewis suffered a broken leg in the game.

The original schedule for the team, as published in October 1900, included two games against the University of Maine; however, the first Maine–New Hampshire game would not occur until 1903.

The New Hampshire second team (reserves) defeated Dover High School, 11–6, in a game played in Durham on November 15.

Notes

References

New Hampshire
New Hampshire Wildcats football seasons
New Hampshire football